Carleen is a female given name, a variant form of Caroline or Carolyn, and may also refer to one of the following

Given name 

 Carleen Anderson (born 1957), American singer
Carleen Bright, former mayor of Woodway, Texas, for whom the Carleen Bright Arboretum is named
Carleen Goodridge of the Brigitte Harris case
 Carleen Hutchins (1911 – 2009), American violin maker

Middle name

Tiffeny Carleen Milbrett, full name of Tiffeny Milbrett (born 1972), American soccer player
Andrea Carleen Harrison, full name of Andrea Harrison (born 1963), American politician

See also

Carlee
Karleen

Given names